Huli may refer to:

 Huli (dish), a lentil-based dish, also called Sambar, common in South India and Sri Lanka
 Huli people, indigenous people in Papua New Guinea
 Huli language, language of Huli people
 Huli District, district in Xiamen, Fujian, China
 Huli, Meichuan, a village in Meichuan, Wuxue, Huanggang, Hubei, China
 Capsize, or Huli in Polynesian language (used worldwide in outrigger canoeing), boat or ship turned on its side or overturned.  Example in Hawaiian pidgin

See also
 Huli-huli chicken
 Holi (disambiguation)

Language and nationality disambiguation pages